Jerry Mackie (born January 10, 1962) is a former American businessman and politician.

Born in Ketchikan, Alaska, Mackie graduated from Ketchikan High School in 1980. He owned the Sunnahae Lodge in Craig, Alaska. Mackie served in the Alaska House of Representatives from 1991 to 1996 and was a Democrat. He then served in the Alaska Senate from 1997 to 2000.

References

1962 births
20th-century Native Americans
Alaska Democrats
Alaska Republicans
Alaska state senators
American lobbyists
Businesspeople from Alaska
Haida people
Living people
Members of the Alaska House of Representatives
Native American state legislators in Alaska
People from Ketchikan, Alaska